Bronze Dragon: Conquest of Infinity is a 1985 video game published by Commonwealth Software.

Gameplay
Bronze Dragon: Conquest of Infinity is a game in which the fantasy adventuring campaign has a detailed background with 13 plots that the player can choose from.

Reception
Johnny Wilson reviewed the game for Computer Gaming World, and stated that "For all of its similarity to other systems, BD is an imaginative game with its own character. The variety of attack options, artifacts, monster attacks, and plot twists makes it a distinctive, enjoyable and satisfying game."

References

External links
Review in Washington Apple Pi

1985 video games
Apple II games
Apple II-only games
Fantasy video games
Role-playing video games
Video games developed in the United States